Aloysius Josef G. Dibjokarjono (25 December 1917 − 23 January 2002) was an Indonesian Roman Catholic bishop.

Ordained to the priesthood on 2 June 1945, Dibjokarjono was named bishop of Roman Catholic Diocese of Surabaya, Indonesia on 2 April 1982 and retired on 26 March 1994.

References 

1917 births
2002 deaths
People from Blitar
20th-century Roman Catholic bishops in Indonesia